The Lynn Memorial City Hall and Auditorium is a large Art Deco building that defines the civic heart of Lynn, Massachusetts. The building serves three functions: first, it houses the city's principal offices, including the mayor's office, as well as the chambers of the city council.  Second, it memorializes the city's fallen in the nation's military conflicts.  Third, it houses a large public performance space, with a seating capacity over 2,000.  It is located at Three City Hall Square.

The building was constructed in 1948-49 by the M.A. Dyer Company and John Bowen Company.  Lynn's mayor Albert Cole was the driving force behind the design and construction of the building, which was added to the National Register of Historic Places in 2005.

Gallery

See also
National Register of Historic Places listings in Lynn, Massachusetts
National Register of Historic Places listings in Essex County, Massachusetts

References

External links
Lynn City Hall History (accessed January 8, 2009)

Concert halls in Massachusetts
Theatres in Massachusetts
Performing arts centers in Massachusetts
Buildings and structures in Lynn, Massachusetts
Auditoriums in the United States
Government buildings completed in 1949
City and town halls on the National Register of Historic Places in Massachusetts
National Register of Historic Places in Lynn, Massachusetts
1940s architecture in the United States
Art Deco architecture in Massachusetts
Event venues on the National Register of Historic Places in Massachusetts
City halls in Massachusetts